Leonard Wood (1860–1927) was Chief of Staff of the U.S. Army, Military Governor of Cuba and Governor General of the Philippines.

Leonard Wood may also refer to:

 Leonard Wood (Prince Edward Island politician) (1865–1957), farmer, trader and political figure
 Leonard Wood (racing) (born 1934), NASCAR co-owner of Wood Brothers Racing
 Leonard Wood (footballer), English footballer
 Len Wood (born 1942), Canadian politician
 Fort Leonard Wood, Missouri, U.S. military base

See also
 Leonard Woods (disambiguation)